Stenoma oxyschista is a moth of the family Depressariidae. It is found in Amazonas, Brazil.

The wingspan is 11–13 mm. The forewings are dark grey, the costal third and apical area beyond the third line white and there are three very oblique strong dark fuscous lines from the costa to the disc, the third curved round beneath to the tornus. Beneath these, the disc is variably streaked longitudinally with white and dark fuscous, especially a dark fuscous plical streak on the basal third, and a median streak on the central third. There are two or three distinct black marginal dots or marks above the apex, and one or two minute dots below. The hindwings are rather dark grey.

References

Moths described in 1925
Taxa named by Edward Meyrick
Stenoma